Daniel Westermark (born 6 April 1963) is a Swedish professional golfer.

Westermark enjoyed success on the Challenge Tour in the early 1990s where he won the 1993 Campeonato de Castilla and the 1994 Centenario Copa Palmer. He also finished runner-up in the 1991 Neuchatel Open, 1993 Kenya Open, 1994 Neuchatel Open, 1994 Tessali Open, 1994 El Corte Ingles Open, 1996 Is Molas Challenge and the 1998 Volvo Finnish Open. 

Westermark qualified for the 1995 European Tour and finished 165th on the Order of Merit. In total, he played 61 European Tour events between 1987 and 2000, earning €46,447 in official prize money.

Westermark later become the club professional at El Paraiso Golf Club in Estepona, Spain.  He claimed the 16th and final card at qualifying school in Portugal to earn conditional playing rights for the 2015 European Senior Tour season.

Professional wins (3)

Challenge Tour wins (2)

Challenge Tour playoff record (0–1)

Swedish Golf Tour wins (1)

References

External links

Swedish male golfers
European Tour golfers
Golfers from Stockholm
People from Marbella
Sportspeople from the Province of Málaga
1963 births
Living people